Byalal is a village in Dharwad district of Karnataka, India.

Demographics
As of the 2011 Census of India there were 332 households in Byalal and a total population of 1,715 consisting of 881 males and 834 females. There were 230 children ages 0-6.

References

Villages in Dharwad district